Michael Joseph Graue (born August 22, 1996) is an American actor, known for his role as Zach, one of the two child survivors from the tail section of Oceanic Flight 815 in the television series Lost.

Filmography

References

External links
 

1996 births
American male child actors
Living people